Montreux '77 may refer to:

 Montreux '77 (Count Basie album)
 Montreux '77 (Ray Bryant album)
 Montreux '77 (Ella Fitzgerald album)
 Montreux '77 (Tommy Flanagan album)
 Montreux '77 – Live, an album by Joe Pass